Roll Out the Red Carpet may refer to:

 Roll Out the Red Carpet (Buck Owens album), 1966
 Roll Out the Red Carpet (Royal C album), 1996